"Change" is a song by Australian singer/songwriter Daniel Merriweather featuring a rap verse from American rapper Wale. It was written by Merriweather and Andrew Wyatt and produced by Mark Ronson. It was released on 30 January 2009 in the United States and Canada, and 2 February 2009 in the UK (where the song peaked at no.8).

The song is included on Merriweather's album Love & War. The music video was directed by Elliot Jokelson.

Daniel Merriweather performed this song on the Seven Network's Sunrise on the morning of 26 June 2009; just after this performance news of Michael Jackson's death was broken.

Reviews
Digital Spy gave the song 3/5 stars saying that "Lead single 'Change' is a typically snazzy Ronson production — there are horns and lightly funky beats as you'd expect".

Angryape.com had this to say about the song "newcomer Daniel Merriweather is already well on his way to a top 10 hit before this single has even touched radio airwaves. Perhaps best known as the "voice" on Ronson's 2007 hit 'Stop Me' or Wiley's Cash in My Pocket,".

Thebeatreview.com gave the song 5/5 stars saying that it was "a pretty decent R&B song filled with stumping basses, satisfying drums and incorporated with some piano and saxophone/trumpet/horn. It's funky, soulful yet proving to be very catchy".

The Daily Music Guide gave the song 3/5, commenting that the "results possibly aren't as mind-blowing as perhaps the PR says on the tin" but is "a decent enough pop song".

CD single track listing
"Change"
"I Think I'm in Love"

Charts

Weekly charts

Year-end charts

References

2009 singles
Daniel Merriweather songs
Wale (rapper) songs
Song recordings produced by Mark Ronson
2009 songs
Songs written by Daniel Merriweather
Songs written by Andrew Wyatt